James Lee Hart (also known as John Hart, born c. 1944) is an American political activist.

Biography
Hart ran as a Republican for the House of Representatives for Tennessee's Eighth District in 2004. His campaign was unconventional in part in listing for itself an out-of-state address, in Kentucky. The Republican Party disavowed him, and he lost to incumbent Democrat John Tanner.

He has said that on the campaign trail, he wears a bulletproof vest and carries a gun.

Hart believes in withdrawal from the North American Free Trade Agreement (NAFTA), increasing the minimum wage, ending welfare, and in his words, "workers' rights generally."  His most controversial and well-publicized political belief is his support for eugenics.  He claims that certain races are "favored races" that produce high accomplishments such as the automobile, and that others are not.  He wants to conduct a war on "poverty genes," which he claims reside, among other places, in Detroit.  In light of his eugenics position, the Tennessee Republican leadership sought to dissociate themselves from him, and backed the competing write-in campaign of Dennis Bertrand.

Hart received 26 percent of the vote (second place) in a largely self-financed campaign.

He ran again in 2006. Republican state leadership successfully petitioned to have him removed from the ballot on the grounds that he was not a bona fide member of the party. Hart's attorney in the matter was Richard Barrett.

He ran again in 2008 and 2010. Republican state leadership successfully petitioned to have him removed from the ballot on the grounds that he was not a bona fide member of the party.

References

External links
Hart for Congress

Tennessee Republicans
American eugenicists
American white supremacists
Living people
Year of birth missing (living people)